
Trojan was an automobile manufacturer and a Formula One constructor, in conjunction with Australian Ron Tauranac, from the United Kingdom.

The car producer Trojan Limited was founded by Leslie Hounsfield in 1914 in Clapham, South London, and later in Purley Way, Croydon, Surrey. It produced cars and especially delivery vans until 1964.

Around 1960, the Trojan business was sold to Peter Agg who imported Lambretta scooters for the British market. In 1962, the rights to manufacture the Heinkel microcar were acquired and the production line was moved from Dundalk, Ireland to Croydon. Production then commenced, renaming the bubble car as Trojan Cabin Cruiser. Production continued until 1965, when some 6,000 cars had been produced. Speaking to Motor Cycle magazine in 1965 after cessation of production, Peter Agg confirmed that a 1962 British government reduction in purchase tax from 50% to 25% aligning car taxation with three-wheelers and motorbikes, had given a big boost to the cheaper end of the car market, adversely affecting sales of the economy-sector three-wheeler, making continued production uneconomical.

Also in 1962, Trojan acquired the Elva sports car business and started to make the Mk IV Elva Courier. This in turn led to the manufacturing of McLaren racing cars until vehicle production finally ceased in the early 1970s. Trojan Limited still exists as an independent company though the factory was sold in the 1970s.

The Trojan T101 Formula 5000 model met with success when Jody Scheckter won the 1973 SCCA L&M Championship driving a T101 and a Lola T330.

They participated in eight grands prix, entering a total of eight cars. In 1974 David Purley won the Brighton Speed Trials driving a Trojan-Chevrolet T101. While Formula One remained the major series, sports cars were also fashionable on either side of the Atlantic. The McLaren M1 was put into production by Peter Agg's Lambretta Trojan Group in Rye, Sussex. They would make 200 McLarens during ten years.

Complete Formula One World Championship results
(key)

See also
Trojan (automobile)

References
All Formula One results are taken from formula1.com

External links
Trojan Museum Trust
F1 Rejects article about the team

Formula One constructors
Formula One entrants
Defunct motor vehicle manufacturers of the United Kingdom
British auto racing teams
British racecar constructors